Kudrino is a rural locality (a selo) in Krutovsky Selsoviet of Volodarsky District, Astrakhan Oblast, Russia. The population was 146 as of 2010. There are 2  streets.

Geography 
Kudrino is located 20 km east of Volodarsky (the district's administrative centre) by road. Marfino is the nearest rural locality.

References 

Rural localities in Volodarsky District, Astrakhan Oblast